The Shreveport Grays were a minor-league baseball team based from Shreveport, Louisiana. The team played in 1895 in the Texas-Southern League.

See also 

Historical Minor League Statistics

References

Defunct minor league baseball teams
Baseball teams established in 1895
Grays
Professional baseball teams in Louisiana
1895 establishments in Louisiana
Defunct baseball teams in Louisiana
Baseball teams disestablished in 1895
1895 disestablishments in Louisiana
Texas-Southern League teams